Cecropia velutinella is a species of plant in the family Urticaceae. It is endemic to Ecuador.  Its natural habitat is subtropical or tropical moist montane forests. It is threatened by habitat loss.

References

velutinella
Endemic flora of Ecuador
Vulnerable plants
Taxonomy articles created by Polbot